Bryncoch Rugby Football Club are a Welsh rugby union club based in the town of Bryncoch in Neath, Wales. The club is a member of the Welsh Rugby Union and is also a feeder club for the Ospreys. The club fields First, Second and Youth teams.

Club honours
1951/52 League Champions Neath & District.
1954/55 League Champions Neath & District.
1958/59 League Champions Neath & District.
1960/61 League Champions Neath & District.
1970/71 League Champions Neath & District.
1978  WRU Cup.
2008/09 WRU Division Four South West - Champions.

Notes

Welsh rugby union teams
Rugby union in Neath Port Talbot